America's War on Abortion is a 2020 documentary film by Deeyah Khan. The film is produced by Deeyah's production company Fuuse and received its world premiere on ITV and NRK2 on October 29, 2020.

Filmed before and during the 2020 global crisis, two-time Emmy winner Deeyah Khan turns her focus to the extreme beliefs weaponised under Trump’s rule.  In America's War on Abortion, Deeyah Khan examines the erosion of reproductive rights in the US. Featuring accounts from activists fighting for – and against – women’s right to choose.

Deeyah investigates one of the most divisive issues in American politics. She films at abortion clinics and meets the abortion providers and the women who seek abortions. The film also features a man convicted of bombing and burning clinics. In his time in office, Donald Trump has wooed evangelical Christian voters by enacting anti-abortion policies including bringing conservative judges on the Supreme Court. Deeyah Khan goes on the front line to find the people who will be most affected by the abortion wars.

Cast
Dr. Yashica Robinson
Julie Burkhart
Jen Jordan
Dr. Sanithia Williams
Donald Spitz
Alex
Catherine Ramey
Josephine Petersen
Daniel and Mary

Accolades

References

External links
Official website

2020 television films
2020 films
2020 documentary films
British documentary films
British television documentaries
Documentaries about politics
Films directed by Deeyah Khan
Documentary films about abortion
2020s British films